The House at 556 Lowell Street in Wakefield, Massachusetts is a high style Queen Anne Victorian in the Montrose section of town.  The -story wood-frame house was built in 1894, probably for Denis Lyons, a Boston wine merchant.  The house is asymmetrically massed, with a three-story turret topped by an eight-sided dome roof on the left side, and a single-story porch that wraps partially onto the right side, with a small gable over the stairs to the front door. That porch and a small second-story porch above are both decorated with Stick style woodwork.  There is additional decoration, more in a Colonial Revival style, in main front gable and on the turret.

The house was listed on the National Register of Historic Places in 1989.

See also
National Register of Historic Places listings in Wakefield, Massachusetts
National Register of Historic Places listings in Middlesex County, Massachusetts

References

Houses in Wakefield, Massachusetts
Houses on the National Register of Historic Places in Wakefield, Massachusetts
Queen Anne architecture in Massachusetts
Colonial Revival architecture in Massachusetts
Houses completed in 1894
1894 establishments in Massachusetts